Ankush Singh (born 12 October 1998) is an Indian cricketer. He made his List A debut for Madhya Pradesh in the 2018–19 Vijay Hazare Trophy on 8 October 2018.

References

External links
 

1998 births
Living people
Indian cricketers
Madhya Pradesh cricketers
Place of birth missing (living people)